Dream Café is an album by American folk singer/guitarist Greg Brown, released in 1992. It was produced by  Bo Ramsey. It is a Red House release.

Reception

Music critic David Freedlander praised the release in his Allmusic review, writing Brown "Brown produces an album as light and refreshing as a summer breeze. Although it is plagued by the inconsistency which characterizes most of his studio work, some of his most heartfelt and enduring songs can be found on this album..." Bill Wyman of Entertainment Weekly wrote "... on Dream Café he's more varied musically — he'll do a grinding blues and even flirt with jazz. Also, he wields simpler but more forceful melodies, and is still very capable of pulling off a marvelous portrait, as in the moving Spring Wind."

Track listing
All songs by Greg Brown.
 "Just by Myself" – 4:45
 "Sleeper" – 4:28
 "I Don't Know That Guy" – 4:51
 "So Hard" – 2:38
 "You Can Watch Me" – 3:37
 "Dream Cafe" – 5:55
 "You Drive Me Crazy" – 4:56
 "Spring Wind" – 4:32
 "Nice When it Rains" – 3:10
 "Laughing River" – 4:16
 "No Place Away" – 4:10
 "I Don't Want to Be the One" – 3:24

Personnel
Greg Brown – vocals, guitar, harmonica
Bo Ramsey – guitar
Tim Sparks – requinto
Robin Adnan Anders – percussion, tabla, tupan, dourbakee
Gordon Johnson – bass
Dan Lund – guitar
Kate McKenzie – background vocals
Willie Murphy – piano, organ

Production
Produced by Bo Ramsey
Engineered by Tom Tucker
Mixed by Bob Feldman

References

External links
"The Ten Best Albums of 1992" Fast Folk Musical Magazine, (February 1993) p.12-13

Greg Brown (folk musician) albums
1992 albums
Red House Records albums